Justin Davis (born May 6, 1988) is an American soccer player.

Career

College and amateur
Davis was born in Commerce, Michigan. He played his college career at the University of New Mexico where he played mainly as a forward, but was noted for his versatility. Davis led the MPSF in scoring while earning first team all-MPSF accolades. He also earned second team all-Far West Region honors.

During his college years Davis also played for Des Moines Menace in the USL Premier Development League.

Professional
Davis was drafted in the second round (32nd overall) of the 2010 MLS SuperDraft by Real Salt Lake, but was not offered a contract by the team. He signed with the NSC Minnesota Stars in the North American Soccer League in 2011, and made his professional debut on April 30, in a 1–1 tie with the Carolina RailHawks. He scored his first professional goal on May 18, in a 2–0 win over the Puerto Rico Islanders.

Minnesota announced in December 2011 that Davis would return for the 2012 season.

Nashville SC announced on January 4, 2018, that Davis had signed for Nashville's inaugural United Soccer League season, along with Michael DeGraffenreidt, Josh Hughes and Bolu Akinyode. Nashville was selected two weeks earlier to join Major League Soccer (MLS) in either 2019 or 2020.

Career statistics

References

External links
 New Mexico Lobos bio

1988 births
Living people
American soccer players
Association football defenders
New Mexico Lobos men's soccer players
University of New Mexico alumni
Real Salt Lake draft picks
Des Moines Menace players
Minnesota United FC (2010–2016) players
Minnesota United FC players
Nashville SC (2018–19) players
USL League Two players
North American Soccer League players
Major League Soccer players